South Korea competed at the 2020 Summer Paralympics in Tokyo, Japan, from 24 August to 5 September 2021.

Medalists

Competitors
Source:

Archery 

South Korea has qualified three archers in Women's Individual W1, Women's Individual Recurve, and Mixed Team Recurve.

Athletics 

Yoo Byung-hoon qualified in Men's 400m, 800m T53 events, while Jeon Min-jae qualified in Women's 200m T36.

Badminton 

South Korea has qualified a total of nine para badminton players for each of the following events into the Paralympic tournament based on the Para Badminton World Rankings.

Men

Women

Boccia 

Six South Korean athletes qualified in Individual BC1, BC2, and BC3 events.

Cycling 

South Korea sent one male & one female cyclist after successfully receiving a slot in the 2018 UCI Nations Ranking Allocation Asian quota.

Powerlifting

Rowing

South Korea qualified one boat in the women's single sculls for the games by winning the B-final at the 2019 World Rowing Championships in Ottensheim, Austria and securing the last of the seven available places.

Qualification Legend: FA=Final A (medal); FB=Final B (non-medal); R=Repechage

Shooting 

Fourteen South Korean shooters have qualified.
 Park Chul (Mixed 25m Pistol SH1)
 Moon Aee-kyung (Mixed 50m Pistol SH1)
 Park Jin-hoo & Lee Seung-chul (Men's 10m Air Rifle Standing SH1)
 Sim Jae-yong & Lee Jang-ho (Mixed 10m Air Rifle Prone SH1)
 Lee Ji-seok (Mixed 10m Air Rifle Standing SH2)
 Ju Sung-chul (Mixed 50m Rifle Prone SH1)
 Shim Young-jip (Men's 50m Rifle 3 Position)
 Lee Yun-ri & Kang Myung-soon (Women's 50m Rifle Three Position)

Swimming 

Five South Korean swimmers have successfully qualified for the Paralympic slot after passing the MQS.

Table tennis

South Korea entered sixteen athletes into the table tennis competition at the games. Five athletes qualified from the 2019 ITTF Asian Para Championships which was held in Taichung, Taiwan and eleven athletes from the World Ranking allocation.

Men

Women

Taekwondo

South Korea qualified one athlete. Joo Jeong-hun qualified by winning the gold medal at the 2021 Asian Qualification Tournament in Amman, Jordan.

Wheelchair basketball 

South Korea's men's wheelchair basketball team qualified for the 2020 Summer Paralympics after finishing in top three at the 2019 IWBF Asia Oceania Wheelchair Basketball Championship in Pattaya, Thailand.

Wheelchair tennis

South Korea qualified four player entries for wheelchair tennis. Two of them qualified through the world rankings, while two others qualified under bipartite commission invitation allocation quotas.

See also
South Korea at the Paralympics
South Korea at the 2020 Summer Olympics

References 

Nations at the 2020 Summer Paralympics
2020
2020 Summer Paralympics